Mount Melville railway station served the Mount Melville estate outside St Andrews, Fife, Scotland from 1887 to 1930 on the Anstruther and St Andrews Railway.

History 
The station opened on 1 June 1887 by the St Andrews Railway. It closed on 1 January 1917 but reopened on 1 February 1919 before closing permanently on 22 September 1930.

References 

Disused railway stations in Fife
Railway stations in Great Britain opened in 1887
Railway stations in Great Britain closed in 1917
Railway stations in Great Britain opened in 1919
Railway stations in Great Britain closed in 1930
1887 establishments in Scotland
1930 disestablishments in Scotland
Former North British Railway stations